Balaji Kinikar is a Shiv Sena politician from Ambernath, Maharashtra. He is a member of Legislative Assembly from Ambernath Vidhan Sabha constituency, Maharashtra, India. He has been elected for 3 consecutive terms in the Maharashtra Legislative Assembly in 2009,2014 & 2019.

Controversy
On 26 December, Kinikar led a delegation of fellow Shiv Sena workers outside the office of Maharashtra Industrial Development Corporation executive engineer Sanjay Nanavare in Thane, concerning water shortage being faced by residents of Ulhasnagar. During the discussion with Nanavare, SS Ulhasnagar city president Rajendra Chowdhary, party corporator Ramesh Chavan and two others ransacked the office and also smashed Nanavare's cell phone on a table and threw chairs at him. The four were arrested and charged with criminal force to deter a public servant from discharge of his duty, voluntarily causing hurt to deter a public servant from his duty, mischief, intentional insult, and criminal intimidation.

Positions held
 2009: Elected to Maharashtra Legislative Assembly (1st term)
 2014: Re-Elected to Maharashtra Legislative Assembly (2nd term)
 2019: Re-Elected to Maharashtra Legislative Assembly (3rd term)

References

External links
 Official website
 Shiv Sena Official website

Living people
Maharashtra MLAs 2009–2014
Maharashtra MLAs 2014–2019
Shiv Sena politicians
1972 births
People from Thane district
People from Latur
Marathi politicians